Imad Shakhashiro (born 1963), better known as Imad Rami, is a Syrian Nasheed singer of Islamic music.

Biography
Shakhashiro was born in Damascus, Syria.
Shakhashiro is known for his beats and vocal strength. His songs range from spiritual to wedding genre. He has performed at concerts at events across the world, including in Damascus and other Syrian cities. He was invited several times to Lebanon to sing at one of the biggest castles of UNESCO, then in Sayda, Tripoli, Jordan, Saudi Arabia, Algeria, Cairo, United States, and United Kingdom.

See also
Syrian people
Music of Syria

References

External links

1963 births
Living people
Date of birth missing (living people)
Syrian Muslims
21st-century Syrian male singers
People from Damascus
20th-century Syrian male singers